The East Greenbush Community Library serves a chartered special district, including the town of East Greenbush, New York and portions of the town of Schodack, New York under contract, bringing the total number of patrons to nearly 30,000. The library is also a member of the Upper Hudson Library System, a resource-sharing consortium consisting of the 29 public libraries in Albany and Rensselaer Counties.
The East Greenbush Community Library is a busy suburban library with holdings of 98,622 items, 26 public computers, four meeting rooms and programming for all ages. In 2011, 228,146 people entered the library. The “Friends of the Library” volunteer group runs four book sales each year, supporting the library’s collection and programming.

History
Originally, library services in East Greenbush were provided by two “association” libraries that opened in the 1940s. The Katherine Wirth Memorial Library was located in the basement of the Clinton Heights School (now the East Greenbush Town Hall) and the other was located in the Bates Building on Columbia Turnpike.  In 1974 the two merged, with the main branch located in the Bates Building. In 1984, the collection was unified and moved to a 2,670 square foot area of the Town Hall. In 1988, residents voted in favor of creating a taxing district for the library that made it a true town library.  Today, residents vote directly on the library budget and the governing Board of Trustees.

Building Construction
 
By 1995, it had become evident that the library needed more space, and the long process of building the library’s present site began.  The architectural firm of Lepera and Ward designed a 2.45 million dollar project with 20,000 square feet of space on 10 acres.  Ground-breaking ceremonies were held on June 6, 2000, and the new library celebrated its grand opening on March 4, 2001.

The library’s design includes high ceilings, exposed trusses, and towering windows, creating a bright and inviting space.  The separate Youth Services area is where children can play, read, use computers, and find books, music, videos and games.  Recently, another room was designated as a space for an active teen and “tween” population.

Special collections
Special collections include Local History, Literacy, Education and Career Guidance and Parenting.  Some of the services offered by the library include: downloadable e-books and audiobooks, movie and video game rental, children’s programming, free introductory computer instruction, defensive driving classes, storytelling, musical/stage productions, free movie showings for both children and adults, museum passes, public scanner/copier and fax, public computers and Wi-Fi, tax forms, inter-library loan, Books with Wheels, and outreach to special populations.

References

External links
East Greenbush Community Library Website

Buildings and structures in Rensselaer County, New York
Libraries in New York (state)